The 1962 Louisiana Tech Bulldogs football team was an American football team that represented the Louisiana Polytechnic Institute (now known as Louisiana Tech University) as a member of the Gulf States Conference during the 1962 NCAA College Division football season. In their twenty-second year under head coach Joe Aillet, the team compiled a 4–4 record.

Schedule

References

Louisiana Tech
Louisiana Tech Bulldogs football seasons
Louisiana Tech Bulldogs football